Yevgeniya Andreyevna Polyakova (born 29 May 1983 in Moscow) is a Russian sprinter who specializes in the 100 metres.

Polyakova represented Russia at the 2008 Summer Olympics in Beijing competing at the 100 metres sprint. In her first round heat she placed first in front of Jade Bailey and Sherone Simpson in a time of 11.24 to advance to the second round. There she improved her time to 11.13 seconds, finishing second behind Shelly-Ann Fraser to qualify for the semi finals. With a time of 11.38 she was unable to qualify for the final as her time was only the seventh time of her heat, causing elimination. Together with Aleksandra Fedoriva, Yulia Gushchina and Yuliya Chermoshanskaya she also took part in the 4x100 metres relay. In their first round heat they placed second behind Jamaica, but in front of Germany and China. Their time of 42.87 seconds was also the second time overall out of sixteen participating nations. With this result they qualified for the final in which they sprinted to 42.31 seconds, the first place and the gold medal. The Jamaican team did not finish due to a mistake in the baton exchange.

In August 2016, she and her three Russian teammates were stripped of their Olympic gold medal due to a doping violation by Chermoshanskaya.

International competitions

Personal bests 
60 metres – 7.09 s (2008, indoor)
100 metres – 11.09 s (2007)

References 

 

1983 births
Living people
Athletes from Moscow
Russian female sprinters
Olympic female sprinters
Olympic athletes of Russia
Athletes (track and field) at the 2008 Summer Olympics
Competitors stripped of Summer Olympics medals
Universiade gold medalists in athletics (track and field)
Universiade gold medalists for Russia
European Athletics Indoor Championships winners
Russian Athletics Championships winners